Alfred Turner may refer to:

Alfred Jefferis Turner (1861–1947), British and Australian pediatrician and entomologist
Alfred Dudley Turner (1854–1888), American composer
Alfred Turner (sculptor) (1874–1940), British sculptor
Sir Alfred Edward Turner (1842–1918), British army officer